Janseola is a genus of moths in the family Heterogynidae. It was described by Walter Hopp in 1923

Species
 Janseola fulvithorax Hampson
 Janseola titaea Druce, 1896
 Janseola thoinds Zilli, Cianchi, Racheli & Bullini, 1988
 Janseola eremita Zilli, Cianchi, Racheli & Bullini, 1988

References

Heterogynidae